Shenmue II is a 2001 action-adventure game developed by Sega AM2 and published by Sega for the Dreamcast. It was directed, produced and written by Yu Suzuki. Like the original Shenmue (1999), Shenmue II consists of open-world environments, brawler battles and quick-time events. It features a day-and-night system, variable weather effects, non-player characters with daily schedules, and various minigames. The player controls the teenage martial artist Ryo Hazuki as he arrives in Hong Kong in 1987 in pursuit of his father's killer. His journey takes him to Kowloon and the mountains of Guilin, where he meets a girl who is part of his destiny.

Some of Shenmue II was developed alongside the original Shenmue, which was the most expensive video game ever developed at the time. An enhanced port was released for the Xbox in 2002; the Dreamcast version was not released in North America, where Microsoft secured console exclusivity. Shenmue II received positive reviews for its story and scale, though reviews of the port were less positive, with critics finding its graphics lacking compared to other Xbox games. It has appeared in several lists of the greatest games of all time.

Shenmue II sold poorly and further games in the series entered a period of development hell lasting over a decade. In 2018, Sega released high-definition ports of Shenmue and Shenmue II for multiple formats. Shenmue III, developed by Suzuki's company Ys Net, was released in 2019 following a successful crowdfunding campaign.

Gameplay

Like the original Shenmue, the player controls the teenage martial artist Ryo Hazuki in his journey for revenge. Most of the game is spent exploring the game's open world, searching for clues, examining objects and talking to non-player characters for information. The game features a 3D fighting system similar to Sega's Virtua Fighter series; Ryo can fight multiple opponents at once and practice moves to increase their power. In quick-time events, the player must press the right combination of buttons at the right moment to succeed.

Shenmue II adds several features. Players can ask for directions from passersby, and fast-forward the game's clock when waiting for a scheduled event to occur, such as a shop opening or character arriving. Unlike the first Shenmue, taking a job is not part of the main story, and the player can choose how to earn money—for example, by gambling, arm wrestling, street fighting or running a pachinko stand. Ryo can spend money on items such as capsule toys or 1980s arcade games including Hang-On, After Burner, Space Harrier and Out Run. The Dreamcast version allows the player to import their save data from the first Shenmue, transferring money, items and martial arts moves.

Plot 
In 1987, the teenage martial artist Ryo Hazuki arrives from Japan in Wan Chai, Hong Kong on the trail of his father's killer, Lan Di, of the criminal Chi You Men organization. He searches for Master Lishao Tao, the only link to the whereabouts of Yuanda Zhu, a martial arts expert who sent Ryo's father a letter warning him of Lan Di's intentions. When Ryo finds Tao, whose real name is Xiuying Hong, she refuses to help, considering his quest for vengeance reckless. The two part ways, but Xiuying continues to monitor Ryo's progress.

Ryo encounters Wuying Ren, the wily leader of a street gang. Ren decides to help Ryo after deciding there may be money to be made in Ryo's mysterious phoenix mirror; Lan Di took the second mirror, the dragon mirror, when he killed Ryo's father. Wong, a street boy who admires Ren, and Joy, a free-spirited motorcyclist, assist Ryo in his journey.

Ren informs Ryo that Zhu is hiding from the Chi You Men in Kowloon Walled City, a densely populated, crime-ridden enclave of Hong Kong. They locate Zhu there but are ambushed by the criminal Yellow Head organization and Zhu is kidnapped. Ryo and his allies infiltrate the Yellow Head headquarters, but Wong and Joy are captured. Ryo defeats a powerful martial artist and rescues Joy. On the rooftop of the Yellow Head building, Ryo rescues Wong and Zhu from the Yellow Head leader, Dou Niu, as Lan Di departs by helicopter.

At Ren's hideout, Zhu reveals that Lan Di killed Ryo's father because he believes Iwao killed his own father. He also reveals that the mirrors will lead to the resurrection of the Qing dynasty, the last imperial dynasty of China. Zhu advises Ryo to continue his search in Bailu Village in Guilin, where he says Lan Di is also heading.

In the mountains of Guilin, Ryo rescues a girl, Shenhua Ling, after she dives into a river to rescue a deer. Shenhua's family is connected to the legacy of the mirrors, and she seems to have magical abilities. They walk through the mountains to her village. At Shenhua's family home, a tree named Shenmue (Chinese for "sedge tree") is in bloom; she explains that her name means "flower of the Shenmue tree". The pair go to a stone quarry on the village outskirts to meet Shenhua's father, but find he is missing. They discover a cryptic note and sword; Ryo combines the sword with the phoenix mirror, triggering a device that reveals a large mural of the dragon and phoenix mirrors.

Development 

Shenmue II was developed by Sega AM2 and directed by Yu Suzuki. Part of the game was developed in tandem with the first Shenmue, which was most expensive video game ever developed at the time and is reported to have cost Sega US$70 million; in 2011, Suzuki said the figure was closer to $47 million including marketing. According to IGN, Shenmue II was completed for "a much more reasonable sum".

Release and ports
Shenmue II was released for Dreamcast in 2001 in Japan and Europe. The Japanese version included Virtua Fighter 4 Passport, promoting Sega's upcoming Virtua Fighter 4. By 2003, the Dreamcast version had sold 100,000 copies, a tenth of the original game's sales.

Microsoft secured console exclusivity rights in North America for Shenmue II. Sega released an enhanced port for Microsoft's Xbox console on October 28, 2002. The port features an additional camera mode, optional filter effects, improved frame rate and lighting, and English-language voice acting. It also contains a DVD of Shenmue: The Movie, a compilation film comprising cutscenes from the original Shenmue that was released in Japanese theaters.

A remake of Shenmue and Shenmue II featuring new models, textures and lighting was canceled in 2017. Instead, Sega released remastered versions of both games for PlayStation 4, Windows, and Xbox One on 21 August 2018. The remaster include updated graphics and control options, improved user interfaces, and Japanese and English voices. Some details, such as product placement, are omitted, and cutscenes are presented in their original aspect ratio due to technical limitations. An anime adaptation of the first two Shenmue games premiered on February 6, 2022.

Reception

The Dreamcast version of Shenmue II received positive reviews. GameSpot found that it was "so much better than its predecessor, refining nearly every aspect of the original", with improved pacing and an "epic feel". Tom Bramwell of Eurogamer felt it was "probably the best swan song the Dreamcast could hope for", taking the console "to the very brink of its capabilities". GamesRadar felt that, like the first game, Shenmue II had some uninteresting elements, but praised the expanded scale and action.

Reviews of the Xbox version were less positive. IGN praised the story, but criticized the English-language voice acting and found the graphics lacking compared to other Xbox games. Eurogamer Martin Taylor criticized it as a "lazy port" and concluded: "Your perseverance with the sluggish pacing can be rewarding, but Shenmue II consistently proves itself an ageing game with ageing looks." It was nominated for GameSpots annual "Best Story on Xbox" award, but lost to Dead to Rights.

Shenmue II was voted the tenth-best game of all time by IGN readers in 2008. In 2013, Den of Geek named Shenmue and Shenmue II the best Dreamcast games, and in 2014 Empire ranked Shenmue II the 51st-best game of all time.

Sequel

After the commercial failure of the first two games, Shenmue III entered a period of development hell lasting over a decade. In September 2011, Suzuki left Sega to focus on his development studio, Ys Net. In June 2015, he launched a successful Kickstarter crowdfunding campaign to develop Shenmue III with Ys Net for PlayStation 4, and Windows having licensed the rights from Sega. It was released in November 2019.

Notes

References

External links

 

2001 video games
Action-adventure games
Dreamcast games
Life simulation games
Microsoft games
Open-world video games
PlayStation 4 games
Rutubo Games games
Sega video games
Shenmue
Single-player video games
Social simulation video games
Video game sequels
Video games about revenge
Video games designed by Yu Suzuki
Video games scored by Satoshi Miyashita
Video games scored by Takenobu Mitsuyoshi
Video games scored by Yuzo Koshiro
Video games set in 1987
Video games set in China
Video games set in Hong Kong
Windows games
Xbox games
Xbox One games
Video games based on Chinese mythology
Video games developed in Japan